Super Dave: Daredevil for Hire is an animated television series produced by DIC Animation City and Reteitalia, S.p.A., in association with Spanish network Telecinco.

In the United States, the show premiered on September 12, 1992 on FOX. The series was cancelled after its first season, but a special based on the series titled The Super Dave Superbowl of Knowledge aired on January 29, 1994. It was later shown in reruns on Toon Disney from 1998-2002.

The show starred and was based on the comedy of Bob Einstein and his Super Dave Osborne persona. Both Bob Einstein and Art Irizawa provided the voices for Super Dave and his assistant, Fuji Hakayito, and also appeared as their characters in live-action skits which ended each episode.

Halfway through the show's initial run, Irizawa was asked to modify his voice for Fuji, following complaints to Fox from Asian-American groups that the character was an offensive stereotype. Irizawa subsequently re-recorded his dialogue for all of the show's episodes.

Cast
 Bob Einstein as Super Dave Osborne
 Art Irizawa as Fuji Hakayito

Additional
 Charlie Adler as Slash Hazard
 Jack Angel
 Jesse Corti
 Brian George
 Don Lake
 Susan Silo
 Kath Soucie
 Louise Vallance
 B. J. Ward
 Frank Welker

Episodes

Home releases
In the United States, Buena Vista Home Video released two single-episode VHS's of the series in 1993, which featured the episodes "Space Case" and "Con Job".

A VHS tape of the series was released in the United Kingdom by Abbey Home Entertainment in February 1994, under their Tempo Kids Club label.

The series was later released onto DVD in South Korea in the 2000s.

References

External links
 
 

1990s American animated television series
1992 American television series debuts
1993 American television series endings
American children's animated comedy television series
Italian children's animated comedy television series
English-language television shows
Fox Broadcasting Company original programming
Fox Kids
Television series by DIC Entertainment
Television series by DHX Media
American television series with live action and animation